Shin Se-hwi is a South Korean actress and model. She is best known for her roles in dramas such as Solomon's Perjury, Sweet Stranger and Me and Children of the 20th Century.

Biography and career
Shin Se Hwi is a South Korean actress and model. She made her debut in the drama, Sweet Stranger and Me. She first attracted attention after appearing on The Brave Teenagers and briefly on iKON’s “My Type” music video. She is also called "Little Han Hyo-joo" and "Second Han Hyo-joo" by Korean netizens.

Filmography

Drama

Film

References

External links 
 
 
 

1997 births
Living people
21st-century South Korean actresses
South Korean female models
South Korean television actresses
South Korean film actresses